Tanuku mandal is one of the 48 mandals in West Godavari district of the Indian state of Andhra Pradesh. It is under the administration of Kovvur revenue division and the headquarters are located at Tanuku. The mandal is bounded by Nallajerla, Devarapalle, Nidadavolu, Unguturu, Pentapadu, Tanuku and Undrajavaram mandals.

Towns and villages 

 census of India, the mandal has 9 settlements, which includes 1 town, an out growth and 8 villages. Tanuku (M) is the only town in the mandal.

The settlements in the mandal are listed below:

Notes
(M) denotes a Municipality
(OG) denotes an Out Growth

See also 
 List of mandals in Andhra Pradesh

References

Mandals in West Godavari district